This is a list compiling the former managers of Clyde Football Club.

The team achieved its highest league placing in the top division, which was third-place, in three separate seasons and under three different managers; Walter Jack in 1908–09 (three points behind champions Celtic), Alex Maley in 1911–12 (nine points behind champions Rangers), and Davie White in 1966–67 (twelve points behind champions Celtc).

Alex Maley led the team to its first national cup final in the club's history, the Scottish Cup final in 1910. Later on Joe Miller led the club to its first national cup final in 48 years, the Scottish Challenge Cup final in 2006.

Paddy Travers is the club's most successful manager with two Scottish Cup final wins in 1939 (4–0 v Motherwell) and 1955 (1–0 v Celtic after a replay), losing a third final in between in 1949 (1–4 v Rangers). His four Scottish Cup final appearances (including the 1937 defeat with Aberdeen) led him to being named one of Scottish football's 50 greatest managers by the Scottish Herald. He also led to the club to four trophies in the one season in 1951–52.

Two former Clyde managers have also gone on to become the Scotland national team manager, John Prentice, who went directly from being Clyde to Scotland manager in 1966, and Craig Brown who left Clyde in 1986 to become Scotland national under-21 team manager and assistant manager to Andy Roxburgh for the full team, later replacing him as Scotland manager in 1993.

Managers

Caretaker managers

Notes

References

External links 

Clyde F.C. managers
Clyde
Managers
Managers